Dr Stuart Clive Ashen (born 16 December 1976), commonly known by his online alias Ashens, is a British comedian, critic and YouTuber known for reviewing various products; his reviews usually include toys, video games and food. , his main YouTube channel has garnered over 1.56 million subscribers.

Early life and education
Stuart Clive Ashen grew up on the Heartsease Estate, Norwich and attended Heartsease High School. He previously worked for PC World and Norwich Union. His mother, Pauline, died of cancer when he was eight years old.

YouTube

Ashen has been reviewing food and various products in a distinctive style on YouTube since 2006. The items he humorously reviews are often low quality and procured from various variety stores (notably UK's Poundland), or are poor knockoffs of well-received or well-known products, which he refers to as "". Featured products are typically personally sourced by Ashen in the UK or during holiday abroad or submitted by viewers. 

He frequently collaborated with his friend and fellow YouTube vlogger Barry Lewis, and in the mid-2010s had a podcast and YouTube channel with him, both called Barshens.

, Ashen has produced 905 videos, has 1.56 million subscribers to his primary YouTube channel Ashens and over 530 million video views. His secondary channel, used mainly for DVD extra-style clips, along with an annual look with Daniel Hardcastle at a series of Advent calendars throughout December, has over 322,000 subscribers and over 54 million video views. In addition to his own channels he has also produced videos for other YouTube channels, which included "The Multiverse", a geek-themed channel controlled by ChannelFlip.

In 2013, Ashen, along with Emma Blackery, Dan Howell (Daniel Howell) and Phil Lester (AmazingPhil), starred as a contestant in a remake of the 1980s TV show Knightmare during the YouTube Geek Week event.

Television
Ashen made his first television appearance on a 2008 episode of Charlie Brooker's Screenwipe, where he played a cameo role as Mr. Noseybonk, a character from the 80s BBC children's show Jigsaw.

Ashen guest starred on The Armstrong & Miller Show for their "The Node" segment in October 2009. In early 2009, Ashen also released a very limited edition DVD anthology dubbed Ashenthology, containing a selection of his early videos, as well as some unseen videos and animations, some of these videos were later released on his second YouTube Account; extraashens.

In 2010, Ashen created the series Ashen's Tech Dump for BBC Online Comedy. In 2011, Ashen co-starred alongside Karen Hayley in another BBC Online Comedy series Back Space. The next year, he starred as himself in The Proxy, a sci-fi webseries produced by ChannelFlip in partnership with Dell Alienware. The series took eight days to film, consists of 10 episodes and won a Marketing Week "Engage Award" in the "Gaming and Entertainment" section.

Film

Ashens and the Quest for the GameChild 

Ashen wrote and starred in Ashens and the Quest for the GameChild, a feature film released in August 2013, for YouTube's "Geek Week". The film also stars Warwick Davis and Robert Llewellyn, and was produced by the multi-channel network ChannelFlip, in association with The Multiverse. The film was partially paid for through crowdfunding website Indiegogo with contributions totalling  at the end of the month, which comprised 41% of the  budget.  it has been viewed over a million times on YouTube. A remastered and slightly extended edition of the movie was released on DVD and Blu-ray on 14 July 2014. On 2 July 2018, the full film was released on his YouTube channel.

Ashens and the Polybius Heist 
In 2016, Ashen confirmed a sequel to Ashens and the Quest for the GameChild at a fan screening. In July 2018 Ashen created another Indiegogo campaign for the sequel titled, Ashens and the Polybius Heist. On 9 May 2019 Ashen announced the principal photography was wrapped. On 5 May 2020 it was announced on the official Twitter account for the film, that The Gaming Muso; a fellow YouTuber, and musician would be performing the opening theme tune for the film. On 9 October 2020 Ashen announced on Twitter that the film is available for preorder, and was released on 19 November 2020 on iTunes, YouTube Movies, Amazon and Vimeo. The reveal trailer/teaser was uploaded on his YouTube channel on 14 October 2020.

Published works
In November 2015 Ashen released the book Terrible Old Games You've Probably Never Heard Of, a collection of textual reviews of poor retro games, released through the Unbound crowdfunding platform. The book reached its funding target in 12 hours.

On 24 February 2017 Ashen announced a sequel to Terrible Old Games You've Probably Never Heard Of, titled Attack of the Flickering Skeletons: More Terrible Old Games You've Probably Never Heard Of, again through Unbound, was released on 2 November 2017.

Ashen released the book Fifty-Thousand Shades of Grey on 23 September 2012; it parodies the popular erotic novel Fifty Shades of Grey. The title is literal, as the book simply consists of the phrase "Shades of Grey" repeated 50,000 times.

Personal life
, Ashen lives in his hometown of Norwich. He has a doctorate in psychology, but claims to have never professionally worked in the field.

In addition to his YouTube channel, Ashen has maintained an active public Twitter presence for years, where he posts about various subjects ranging from his announcements for his YouTube channel to personal thoughts, while his personal website has been inactive since 2016.

Ashen has criticized the veracity of his Wikipedia article and the site in general, saying that it has listed untrue statements about him; he wrote in 2017, "[my article] used to claim I was a spokesman for the British Egg Council".

Bibliography

Filmography

Web series

Television

Film

References

External links
 

1976 births
21st-century British comedians
21st-century English male actors
Actors from Norwich
British Internet celebrities
British animated film directors
Comedy YouTubers
Comedy-related YouTube channels
English YouTubers
English animators
English critics
English male comedians
Entertainment-related YouTube channels
Living people
Media personalities from Norwich